Charles Brower may refer to:
Charles H. Brower (1901–1984), American advertising executive, copywriter, and author
Charles N. Brower, American judge
 Charles Andrew Brower (1857–1924), Ontario farmer and political figure